Playlist: The Very Best of Backstreet Boys is the second greatest hits album by American vocal group Backstreet Boys, released by Legacy Recordings as part of their Playlist series.

Track listing

Reception

Weekly charts

Certifications

Credits

Backstreet Boys
Howie Dorough ― vocals
AJ McLean ― vocals
Nick Carter ― vocals
Brian Littrell ― vocals
Kevin Richardson ― vocals (tracks 1-13)

References

2010 compilation albums
Backstreet Boys albums
Backstreet Boys
Jive Records compilation albums